E. californica  may refer to:
 Encelia californica, the California brittlebush, a flowering plant species native to southern California and Baja California
 Ephedra californica, the California jointfir, California ephedra, desert tea or cañatillo, a plant species native to southern California, Arizona and Baja California
 Eschscholzia californica, the California poppy, a plant species native to the western United States and in Mexico

See also
 List of Latin and Greek words commonly used in systematic names#C